Fort Good Hope (formerly Fort Hope, Fort Charles, also now known as the Charter Community of K'asho Got'ine), is a charter community in the Sahtu Region of the Northwest Territories, Canada.

Its population is about 500, mainly indigenous.  The two principal languages are North Slavey and English. Hunting and trapping are two major sources of income.

The Church of Our Lady of Good Hope, a National Historic Site, is located in the community. The church, completed in 1885, was once home to Father Émile Petitot.

History

The settlement was established as a North West Company fur trading outpost in 1804 (or 1805). It was known mainly as Fort Good Hope, but also as Fort Hope and Fort Charles (not the same as the HBC fort from 1686) The outpost was relocated several times from the current site; between 1804 to before 1823 somewhere between Arctic Red River and Peel River (by NWC and HBC) near Tsiigehtchic, 1823 on the west banks of the Mackenzie near what was called Thunder River near where the rivers runs east-west direction north of current site (labelled in A.K. Isbester 1845 map as Old Fort Good Hope), remained there until 1826 relocated on Manitou Island. Flooding forced HBC to relocate their outpost twice on the east banks in 1836. 

The fur outpost ended in 1918 and became a HBC retail operation that is now known as Northern Stores.

Demographics 

In 2006 the Indigenous population was 465, of which 435 were First Nations, 20 Métis and 10 Inuit.

Transportation 

The only all season access is by air, Fort Good Hope Airport, with flights operated by North-Wright Airways from Inuvik, Norman Wells and Colville Lake.  All flights are non-scheduled passenger service. The old airport runway is now Old Airport Road. The community can be accessed in summer using the Mackenzie River. There is no passenger service and the route is primarily used by the Northern Transportation Company for the summer sealift. Winter access is possible via a winter road from Wrigley located further south. The NWT government is seeking federal funding to help extend the Mackenzie Highway from Wrigley to Tsiigehtchic, where it would connect with the Dempster Highway, as of winter 2014 at least eight major river crossings are in place for the new road, some of which are in use as winter crossings.

First Nations
Fort Good Hope is represented by the K’asho Go’tine Community Council and belong to the Sahtu Dene Council. Through the council they are in negotiations with the Government of Canada for a land claims settlement.

Education

Fort Good Hope currently has three institutes providing some form of education. 

For pre-school, there is the Fort Good Hope Daycare. 

Elementary, junior high and senior high school students attend Chief T'Selehye School. The K-12 school is one of five schools under the Sahtú Divisional Education Council. The current school was rebuilt in 2011 replace the early 1971 building (renovations 1987 and 1994). It also hosts the community library.

For post secondary education Aurora College Learning Centre located in the town allows students to qualify for admission to Aurora College and meet other college and university admission requirements. The closest campus is Inuvik.

Communication infrastructure

Full postal service - located in the Northern Store
Satellite television
Two radio stations
 VF2070 101.9 FM - re-transmitter for CKLB-FM 101.9 FM
 CBQE-FM 105.1 CBC Radio North One Inuvik and re-transmitter for CHAK (AM)

4G cellular service as of  August 20, 2013

Services

There is no hospital in Fort Good Hope and has basic care from the local community counselling centre. Urgent care can be assessed at Sahtú Got'iné Regional Health and Social Services Centre in Norman Wells and critical care requiring hospitalization to Stanton Territorial Hospital in Yellowknife (via air ambulance).

RCMP Fort Good Hope detachment provides general policing in community and under north district of "G" Division, West Region. 

Fire services are provided from one fire station near RCMP detachment. The service has two pumpers.

Climate 

Fort Good Hope experiences a subarctic climate (Dfc), with long, cold winters and short, warm summers.

See also
 List of municipalities in the Northwest Territories

References

External links

Charter communities in the Northwest Territories
Communities in the Sahtu Region
Dene communities
Hudson's Bay Company forts
Road-inaccessible communities of the Northwest Territories